A. and Others v United Kingdom is a human rights case decided by the European Court of Human Rights. It unanimously held that holding prisoners indefinitely under the Anti-terrorism, Crime and Security Act 2001 was incompatible with Article 5.

Background 
In the aftermath of the September 11 attacks, eleven men were detained in HMP Belmarsh under the Anti-terrorism, Crime and Security Act 2001. They were alleged to be involved in extreme Islamic terrorist groups and were suspected of financially supporting them. Given that deporting them would give rise to ill-treatment, they were detained without trial. Eight of the applicants remained in Belmarsh until the Act was repealed by Parliament in 2005.

Judgement and Reasoning 
Following the decision in the House of Lords, the applicants were still kept in detention and therefore applied to the European Court on Human Rights. Scholars have argued that the House of Lords judgment prepared the ground for the judgment of the European Court of Human Rights. 

The Court unanimously ruled that the applicant's detention did not fall within the exception to the right of liberty set out in Article 5 (1)(f) as it was not possible to deport them. The Government argued that Article 5 allows a balance between the right to liberty and the protection of national security from a terrorist threat. The Court stated that the derogating circumstances under Article 15 are judged based on the exigencies of the situation. Much like the House of Lords, the Court considered these measures were disproportionate and discriminatory to non-nationals, as the Act only applied to non-British nationals and in principle the terrorist threat is posed equally by nationals and non-nationals. The Court, therefore, found a violation for nine of the applicants.

The Court also found a violation of Article 5(4) in regarding four of the applicants, since due process was not satisfied during the proceedings. Some of the evidence used against the applicants was not disclosed to them and the advocates of the Special Immigration Appeals Commission could not communicate with their clients.

The Court also found a violation of Article 5(5), in providing compensation for unlawful detention, for all the applicants, except two.

As the applicants had domestic remedies to complain about their detention conditions, but did not make use of them, the Court found no violation of Article 3.

Significance 
This case has been argued as being "pivotal and an important statement on how far we can treat suspected foreign terrorists differently from criminal suspects." It also highlighted the importance of the judiciary assessing the legality of the government decisions. Lord Hope stated that the judiciary holding the government to account is "a cardinal feature of the modern democratic state."

The Anti-terrorism, Crime and Security Act 2001 was replaced by the Prevention of Terrorism Act 2005, which was then later repealed by the Terrorism Prevention and Investigation Measures Act 2011.

References

Books

External links 

 ECtHR judgement

European Court of Human Rights cases involving the United Kingdom